The Boston University College of Arts & Sciences (CAS), which includes the Graduate School of Arts & Sciences (GRS), is the largest school at Boston University, offering Bachelor of Arts degrees in over 20 departments and 25 interdisciplinary programs, including those offered through the Pardee School of Global Studies. The departments and programs are divided into four broad categories (natural science, social science, humanities, and math & computer science) and encompass over 2,500 courses and over 70 undergraduate majors and minors; graduate students can earn a master's or Ph.D. in nearly 50 fields. Over 7,000 undergraduates and almost 2,000 graduate students attend the College of Arts & Sciences each year.

CAS was founded in 1873 as the College of Liberal Arts, with Rev. John W. Lindsay serving as the first dean, and was renamed to the College of Arts & Sciences in 1996. The School of All Sciences, which would later become the Graduate School of Arts & Sciences, opened a year later in 1874. Currently, CAS has over 82,000 living alumni and GRS has over 23,000.

External links
 College of Arts and Sciences Main Page
 College of Arts and Sciences Fact Sheet
 College of Arts and Sciences Departmental Listing

References

College of Arts and Sciences
Liberal arts colleges at universities in the United States
1873 establishments in Massachusetts
Educational institutions established in 1873